Tarqetey (also Romanized as Ţarqeţey; also known as Torgutain, Ţorqaţī, and Torqatīn) is a village in Zavin Rural District, Zavin District, Kalat County, Razavi Khorasan Province, Iran. At the 2006 census, its population was 167, in 28 families.

References 

Populated places in Kalat County